Venu Govindaraju is an Indian-American whose research interests are in the fields of document image analysis and biometrics. He presently serves as the Vice President for Research and Economic Development. He is a SUNY Distinguished Professor of Computer Science and Engineering, School of Engineering and Applied Sciences at the University at Buffalo, The State University of New York, Buffalo, NY, USA.

Education
Govindaraju received his undergraduate degree with honors (BTech) in computer science from the Indian Institute of Technology, Kharagpur, India in 1986 and his master's and Ph.D. degrees in computer science in 1988 and 1992 from the University at Buffalo, The State University of New York, Buffalo, NY, USA.

Awards
Govindaraju is a fellow of the Association for Computing Machinery, the IEEE (Institute of Electrical and Electronics Engineers), the AAAS (American Association for the Advancement of Science), the IAPR (International Association for Pattern Recognition), and the SPIE (International Society for Optics and Photonics).

He is the recipient of the 2001 International Conference on Document Analysis and Recognition Young Investigator award, the 2004 MIT Global Indus Technovator Award, the 2010 IEEE Technical Achievement Award, the Indian Institutes of Technology (IIT) Distinguished Alumnus Award (2014), and the 2015 IAPR/ICDAR Outstanding Achievements Award. He was named a Fellow of the National Academy of Inventors in 2015.

Research career
He has spent his entire career at the University at Buffalo.  After graduating with a Ph.D from the University at Buffalo, he worked from 1992 to 2003 as a research scientist at the Center of Excellence for Document Analysis and Recognition (CEDAR), at the University at Buffalo founded and managed by Sargur Srihari.  He became Associate Professor in the Department of Computer Science and Engineering at the University at Buffalo in 2000, a full Professor in 2002, and a SUNY Distinguished Professor, the highest faculty rank in the State University of New York system, in 2010.  Govindaraju was the founding director of the Center for Unified Biometrics and Sensors and has remained its director since its inception in 2003.

References

External links
Center for Unified Biometrics and Sensors

1964 births
Living people
Indian academics
IIT Kharagpur alumni
University at Buffalo faculty
Fellows of SPIE
Fellows of the American Association for the Advancement of Science
Fellows of the Association for Computing Machinery
Fellows of the International Association for Pattern Recognition
Fellow Members of the IEEE
People from Vijayawada
University at Buffalo alumni